Events from the year 1940 in Ireland.

Incumbents
 President: Douglas Hyde
 Taoiseach: Éamon de Valera (FF)

Events
January – the Irish Naval Service acquires the first of its six Motor Torpedo Boats, M1.
3 January – Tomás Óg Mac Curtain shoots and mortally wounds Detective Garda Síochána John Roche in Cork city centre. He had been earlier disarmed by Garda Pat Malone in 1935 and on this occasion he was spared the death penalty in view of his father's history. 
17 January – Enid (Captain Wibe) of neutral Norway sailing from Steinkjer to Dublin, 10 miles north of Shetland, goes to assist SS Polzella which has been torpedoed by German submarine U-25 which then shells and sinks Enid.
7 February – Munster (Capt. R. Paisley) mined and sunk in Irish Sea entering Liverpool.
3 March
 Flooding of Poulaphouca Reservoir begins by damming the River Liffey at Poulaphouca as part of the Electricity Supply Board project to build Ireland's second hydroelectricity generating station together with an improved water supply for Dublin.
 Cato (Capt. Richard Martin), British, from Dublin to Bristol, strikes a mine 2.5 miles west of Nash Point: 13 die, 2 survive.
(She may have moved between the surfacing U-boat and English trawlers, in the hope that the tricolour would protect her while the English escaped.)
10 March – City of Bremen rescues 33 crew of Amor (Dutch) in the North Sea.
29 March – fire destroys the roof and upper rooms of St. Patrick's College, Maynooth.
20–24 April – Plan Kathleen, an Irish Republican Army plan for a Nazi German invasion of Northern Ireland, is presented to the Abwehr.
April – two men die on hunger strike for political status in Mountjoy Jail (Dublin).
4 May – Operation Mainau: German agent Hermann Görtz is parachuted into Ireland to make contact with the IRA.
24 May – first secret meeting to formulate 'Plan W', joint action in the event of a German invasion of Ireland, is held between Irish officials and British military in London.
27 May
The Churchill war ministry in London agrees to seek co-operation from de Valera and creation of an All-Ireland Council during "the present emergency".
Uruguay of neutral Argentina sailing from Rosario to Limerick with 6,000 tons of maize, sinks with scuttling charges by  160 miles from Cape Villano: 15 die, 13 survive.
12 June –  lands a German spy, Karl Simon, in Dingle. He is promptly arrested and interned for the duration.
19 June – Dublin Institute for Advanced Studies established.
23 June – Minister Frank Aiken encourages everyone to store food and water and to prepare a shelter in case of a direct hit.
4 July – Taoiseach Éamon de Valera announces that the policy of neutrality adopted the previous September will not be reversed.
7 July – Operation Lobster I: three German agents are infiltrated into Ireland.
11 July – Moyalla rescues twenty survivors from Athellaird (British) off Cape Clear Island.
15 July
City of Limerick (Capt. R. Ferguson) bombed by aircraft and sinks in Bay of Biscay, 700 miles west of Ushant – 2 dead.
Republican Frank Ryan is released by the authorities of Francoist Spain from Burgos prison into the hands of the German Abwehr.
20 July – City of Waterford (Capt. T. Freehill) shelled by submarine in North Atlantic but escapes.
30 July – Kyleclare rescues 52 survivors from Clan Menzies (British) off Mayo coast.
1 August – collier Kerry Head bombed off Kinsale; she survives this attack, but see 22 October.
8 August
Operation Dove: Republicans Seán Russell and Frank Ryan embark from Nazi Germany on U-boat U-65 for infiltration into Ireland, but Russell will fall ill and die on the passage and the operation is abandoned.
Operation Green (Unternehmen Grün), a proposed German invasion of the south of Ireland, is presented to Nazi German High Command as a diversion for Operation Sea Lion, the invasion of Britain planned at this time.
15 August – Meath (Capt. T. MacFariane) mined and sunk off the South Stack, Holy Island, Anglesey; crew rescued by a local fishing trawler but 700 cattle lost.
16 August – Loch Ryan (Capt. J. Nolan) bombed off Land's End but survives.
24 August – City of Waterford (Capt. T. Freehill) bombed in Irish Sea but survives.
26 August – five German bombs are dropped on County Wexford in a daylight raid. One hits the Shelbourne Co-operative Creamery in Campile killing three women.
27 August – Lanahrone rescues 18 survivors from Goathland (British) off Kerry coast.
4 September
Edenvale (Capt. N. Gillespie) machine-gunned by German plane off Waterford coast.
27 September – Manchester Brigade torpedoed off the Aran Islands.
3 October – the German news agency announces that the German government is willing to pay compensation for dropping bombs on Dublin.
22 October – Kerry Head (Capt. C. Drummond) bombed again: all twelve hands lost, in full view of watchers on Cape Clear Island.
26–28 October – , serving as a troopship under the British flag, is bombed, torpedoed and sunk off the Donegal coast with the loss of 45 lives. At 42,348 GRT she is the war's largest merchant ship loss.
7 November – Éamon de Valera, speaking in response to Winston Churchill's statement, says that there can be no question of handing over Irish ports for use by British forces while they retain control of Northern Ireland.
11 November – Ardmore (Capt. T. Ford) strikes a mine off the Saltee Islands – 24 die.
22 November – the 'Murder of Marlhill' takes place in Knockgraffon near New Inn, County Tipperary.
24 November – James Craig, the first Prime Minister of Northern Ireland, dies suddenly. He has been the longest continually serving Prime Minister in Europe.
19 December – lightship tender Isolda (Capt. A. Bestic) is sunk by German bombers within sight of Carnsore Point: six killed, seven wounded.
20 December – this evening two German bombs fall on Sandycove near Dún Laoghaire, injuring three, and a third bomb falls near Carrickmacross in County Monaghan.
21 December – Innisfallen (Capt. G. Firth) hits a mine off the Wirral Peninsula near New Brighton, Merseyside while leaving Liverpool and sinks; four die.
27 December – Dr. John McQuaid is consecrated as Roman Catholic Archbishop of Dublin and Primate of Ireland, an office he will hold for more than thirty years.

Arts and literature
10 June – Christine Longford's historical play Lord Edward is premiered at the Gate Theatre, Dublin.
5 August – George Shiels' play The Rugged Path is premiered at the Abbey Theatre, Dublin.
4 October – Brian O'Nolan's first  "Cruiskeen Lawn" humorous column is published in The Irish Times; from the second column he uses the pseudonym 'Myles na gCopaleen'. The original columns are composed in Irish. He continues writing the column until the year of his death, 1966.
October – The Bell, a liberal monthly magazine of literature and social comment, is established in Dublin by Peadar O'Donnell under the editorship of Seán Ó Faoláin.
Seán Ó Faoláin publishes his travelogue An Irish Journey and novel Come Back to Erin.
Cecil Day-Lewis publishes Poems in Wartime and his translation of The Georgics of Virgil.
Louis MacNeice's poetry collection The Last Ditch (including "The Coming of War" sequence) is published by Cuala Press in Dublin.
Ewart Milne's poetry collection Letter from Ireland is published in Dublin.

Sport

Football

League of Ireland
Winners: St James' Gate
FAI Cup
Winners: Shamrock Rovers 3–0 Sligo Rovers.

Golf
Irish Open is not played due to The Emergency.

Births
25 January – Philip Boyce, Roman Catholic bishop of the Diocese of Raphoe.
26 January – Séamus Hegarty, Bishop of the Diocese of Raphoe, later Bishop of the Diocese of Derry (died 2019).
2 February – Brendan Daly, Fianna Fáil TD and Cabinet Minister, Senator.
9 February – Seamus Deane, poet and novelist (died 2021).
1 March – Nuala O'Faolain, journalist and writer (died 2008).
22 March – Johnny Fullam, soccer player (died 2015).
27 March – Lorcan Allen, farmer and Fianna Fáil TD for Wexford, youngest person ever elected to Dáil Éireann (at the 1961 general election).
12 April – Dermot Fitzpatrick, Fianna Fáil TD.
13 April – Frank O'Neill, soccer player.
20 April – Alfie Linehan, cricketer (died 2019).
23 April – Timothy Carroll, Roman Catholic bishop serving as Apostolic Vicar in the titular see of Tipasa in Mauretania.
 28 April – Danny Doyle, folk singer (died 2019 in the United States).
11 May – Mary Henry, member of the Seanad (1993–2007) representing University of Dublin and medical doctor.
15 May – Proinsias De Rossa, leader of the Workers' Party and Democratic Left, government Minister and an MEP.
21 May – Ronan O'Rahilly, media entrepreneur (died 2020).
28 May – Maeve Binchy, novelist and columnist (died 2012).
29 May – Donal Murray, Bishop of Limerick (1996– ).
6 June
Willie John McBride, international rugby player.
Michael Smith, Roman Catholic Bishop of Meath.
19 June – Brendan Ingle, boxing trainer (died 2018 in England).
24 June – Adrian FitzGerald, 24th Knight of Kerry.
26 July – Tom Enright, Fine Gael politician.
29 August – Dessie O'Halloran, singer (died 2019).
5 September – Aideen O'Kelly, actress.
12 September – Des Foley, Gaelic footballer and hurler and Fianna Fáil TD (died 1995).
19 October – Michael Gambon, actor.
1 November – Michael Collins, Fianna Fáil TD.
6 November – Johnny Giles, international footballer and broadcaster.
17 November – Luke Kelly, folk singer, member of The Dubliners (died 1984).
1 December – Brendan Toal, Fine Gael TD.
Full date unknown
Mick Carley, Gaelic footballer (died 2019).
Séamus Cleere, Kilkenny hurler.
Martin Coogan, Kilkenny hurler.
Phil Flynn, vice-president of Sinn Féin, businessman.
Nan Joyce, Irish Travellers' rights activist.
John Keogh, soccer player.
Mick Murphy, Tipperary hurler (died 2018).

Deaths
2 January – William Harrington, cricketer (born 1869).
24 January – John Doogan, soldier, recipient of the Victoria Cross for gallantry in 1881 at Laing's Nek, South Africa (born 1853).
9 February – Edward Joseph Byrne, Roman Catholic Archbishop of Dublin (born 1872).
6 April – Samuel Shumack, farmer and author in Australia (born 1850).
3 June – Dan Lane, hurler (Aghabullogue, Cork) (born 1861).
17 June – Dr. Mark F. Ryan, nationalist and author (born 1844).
21 July – John Brunskill, cricketer (born 1875).
22 July – Peter Maher, boxer (born 1869).
14 August – Seán Russell, Irish republican and a chief of staff of the Irish Republican Army (born 1893).
21 September – Mick O'Brien, soccer player and manager (born 1893).
24 November – James Craig, 1st Viscount Craigavon, first Prime Minister of Northern Ireland (born 1871).

References

 
1940s in Ireland
Ireland
Independent Ireland in World War II
Years of the 20th century in Ireland